Westlake High School is a comprehensive public high school located in Fulton County, Georgia and is accredited by the Georgia Department of Education and Southern Association of Colleges and Schools. The academic growth rate for Westlake students was higher that 95% of schools in the state and was above the state average in college readiness in 2019.

History
As a part of the Fulton County School System consolidation plan, Westlake was formed in 1988 by the closing of Westwood and Lakeshore High Schools. The new school used the old Westwood facility until 2008, when Westlake moved into a new state-of-the-art school next to the old campus. Feeder schools include Sandtown Middle School and Camp Creek Middle School.

In the 2012-13 school year, the school received favorable media coverage when CNN's HLN news broadcast a feature segment on then Westlake principal Dr. Grant Rivera and his efforts in engaging students, parents, and faculty in achieving academic and extra-curricular success in today's challenging social environment.

In 2016 the old campus was used for exterior and interior shots for the Lionsgate film, Middle School: The Worst Years of My Life.

In 2020 students received tragic news that their beloved Principal Jamar Robinson and his wife, Ann Marie, a professor at Georgia State University, both drowned while on vacation. Mr. Robinson's father stated that "It's just amazing how many lives he touched, and how far his reach was. I just think it shows how much he was loved and respected." while the county released a written statement stating that "Robinson was an inspirational leader who brought joy with his passion for education and his students. We join the community in remembering him and expressing our condolences to his family."

Magnet program
Westlake's Math/Science Magnet Program prepares students for the academic and career fields of science, technology, engineering, and math (STEM) through rigorous instruction, relevant experiences, and supportive relationships.

Goals
The magnet program at Westlake seeks to provide an academically rigorous foundation for math, science, engineering, and media-based careers. Students are exposed to courses that offer real-world problems and inquiry-based instruction. The program develops partnerships with universities and businesses so that students have access to relevant instructional and internship experiences in medical science, engineering, and media. Students are also encouraged to participate in academic, athletic, and artistic extracurricular activities that support their achievement.

Magnet programs of study
Westlake's magnet program is modeled after college programs in medical science, engineering, and computer science. Each course of study has associated extracurricular clubs and teams, as well as junior and senior summer research internship opportunities available at both Georgia Institute of Technology and Emory University. Students attend monthly forums with guest speakers from college and industry on topics ranging from college planning to careers.

Recent achievements
National 1st place Biology Award in NAACP ACT-SO competition
National 2nd place Science Award in National Institutes of Health competition
Regional Semi-Finalists Engineering Award in Siemens Westinghouse Competition
Regional 1st place Tri-Math-Alon Award in National Society of Black Engineers competition

Application requirements
Students wishing to participate in the magnet program must live in Fulton County and must meet academic criteria, including having taken Algebra I in 8th grade, having a minimum grade of 80/100 in all math and science classes, failing no classes, and having a minimum cumulative average of 80.

Athletics Programs

Boys' Tennis 
In both 2011 and 2012 the Westlake boys' tennis team made it to the GHSA state finals. This marked the first time that an all African American team made it Georgia's highest classification.

Boys' Basketball 
 1999 GHSA Boys' Basketball Champions
 2002 GHSA Boys' Basketball Champions
2016 GHSA AAAAAA Boys' Basketball Champions

Girls'Basketball 
2018 GHSA AAAAAAA Girls' Basketball Champions
2019 GHSA AAAAAA Girls' Basketball Champions
2020 GHSA AAAAA Girls' Basketball Champions
2021 GHSA AAAAA Girls' Basketball Champions
2021 Geico Nationals Girls' Basketball Champions

Girls' Track and Field 
2009 GHSA AAAAA Girls' Track Champions
2013 GHSA AAAAAA Girls' Track and Field Champions
2014 GHSA AAAAAA Girls' Track and Field Champions
2015 GHSA AAAAAA Girls' Track and Field Champions

Dance 
2012 UDA Jazz Dance Large Group Champions
2012 UDA Hip-Hop Dance Large Group Champions

New facility
Construction for a new Westlake facility began in October 2006 and the facility officially opened in August 2008, housing over 2,500 high school students in 99 classrooms. The architectural firm of Gardner, Spencer, Smith, Tench & Jarbeau, P.C. designed the new building while H.J. Russell & Company handled the initial phase of construction. The school had previously been housed in the old Westlake High School building since its opening in 1988. Prior to 1988, the building housed Westwood High School. The MTV show Finding Carter was filmed at the older facility, adjacent to the new one.

Notable alumni
 Keith Adams, football player
 Ian Allen, football player
 Christopher Eubanks, tennis player
 Keyaron Fox, football player, Super Bowl XLIII champion
 Edwin Jackson, football player
 Adam "Pacman" Jones, football player
 LaDawn Jones, Attorney and former member of the Georgia House of Representatives
 Sean Jones, football player
 Wallace Miles, football player
 Anthony Mitchell, football player, Super Bowl XXXV Champion
 Cam Newton, football player, Carolina Panthers, 2010 Heisman Trophy winner, 2015 NFL MVP
 Chuma Okeke, professional basketball player, Orlando Magic
 Kasim Reed, attorney and 59th Mayor of Atlanta (as Westwood High School)
 Tyshun Render, NFL player
 Vince Staples, musician (attended for a year)
 Chris Tavarez, actor
 A. J. Terrell, football player, Atlanta Falcons
 Kiante Tripp, football player
 Chance Warmack, football player
 Ray Willis, basketball player

References

Educational institutions established in 1988
Fulton County School System high schools
1988 establishments in Georgia (U.S. state)